Marcelino Eduardo Britapaja (born November 7, 1950 in Sarmiento, Argentina) is an Argentine former footballer who played as a forward for clubs of Argentina, Brazil, Chile, Colombia and Greece.

Teams
Young categories:
 Banfield 1968–1969
 San Lorenzo 1970

First Division:
 Huracán de Comodoro Rivadavia 1971–1974
 Vélez Sársfield 1974
 Banfield 1975
  Panathinaikos 1975–1976
 All Boys 1977
 Talleres de Córdoba 1978
 Ñublense 1979
 Sarmiento de Junín 1980–1981
 Defensores de Belgrano 1982
 Cúcuta Deportivo 1982–1983
 Huracán de Comodoro Rivadavia 1984–1985
 Loma Negra 1986
 Figueirense 1987

References
 

1950 births
Living people
Argentine footballers
Association football forwards
Argentine Primera División players
Categoría Primera A players
All Boys footballers
Talleres de Córdoba footballers
Club Atlético Banfield footballers
San Lorenzo de Almagro footballers
Club Atlético Vélez Sarsfield footballers
Cúcuta Deportivo footballers
Ñublense footballers
Panathinaikos F.C. players
Figueirense FC players
Argentine expatriate footballers
Argentine expatriate sportspeople in Chile
Expatriate footballers in Chile
Argentine expatriate sportspeople in Brazil
Expatriate footballers in Brazil
Argentine expatriate sportspeople in Greece
Expatriate footballers in Greece
Argentine expatriate sportspeople in Colombia
Expatriate footballers in Colombia